Vunapu  is an Oceanic language spoken in northern Espiritu Santo Island in Vanuatu.

References

Espiritu Santo languages
Languages of Vanuatu